The Quatuor concilia generalia (Tomus primus quatuor Conciliorum generalium & Tomus secundus quatuor Conciliorum generalium) was a two volume book published in 1524 in Paris.  It was edited by Jacques Merlin, printed by Jean Cornilleau and published by Galliot du Pré. It concerns four Ecumenical councils: the Third Council of Constantinople (Sixth Ecumenical Council 680–681), the controversial Second Council of Nicaea (Seventh Ecumenical Council 787), the Council of Constance (sixteenth Ecumenical Council 1414-18) and the dramatic Council of Basel (seventeenth Ecumenical Council 1431–1449).

Known copies
There are very few known extant copies:

In volume one (Tomus primus) of the copy in the Bodleian there is the first example of an English bookplate David Pearson has suggested that the bookplate – painted on paper rather than printed – may have been put there by someone donating the book to Wolsey. Such a bookplate is not to be found in the second volume.

Digital copy
 Tomus primus quatuor Conciliorum vol. 1

References

1524 books
Books about Christianity
Latin books